Actia diffidens is a species of tachinid flies in the genus Actia of the family Tachinidae. It is known to parasitize Canadian tortricid moth larvae.

Distribution
Ontario to New Brunswick, to Missouri and North Carolina and New Mexico.

References

Diptera of North America
diffidens
Insects described in 1933